The McArthur River Uranium Mine, in northern Saskatchewan, Canada, is the world's largest high-grade uranium deposit.

The McArthur River deposit was discovered in 1988. Mine construction began in 1997, with production commencing in 1999. The mine achieved full commercial production in November 2000.

Between 2000 and 2013, the McArthur River/Key Lake operation produced  U3O8. This production figure includes blended low grade stockpiles from the former Key Lake mine as well as ore derived from the McArthur River mine. Ignoring the fact that 2000 mostly saw a ramp-up to full scale production and the effect of the Key Lake mine ore, this averages to roughly  yearly production or some 96% of the above-mentioned 18.7 million pound per year limit.

In 2012, McArthur River was the world's largest producing uranium mine, accounting for 13% of world mine production. Canada, as a whole, produces 15% of the world's uranium production.

In July 2018, citing continued low uranium prices, Cameco suspended McArthur River/Key Lake operations and placed the mine on care and maintenance. , the mine remains under care and maintenance. On February 9, 2022, Cameco announced it would reopen the mine.

Reserves

At an average yearly production rate of  this gives a calculated range of roughly 24 years.

Awards
During the most hazardous mining operations, remote controlled underground mining systems in this mine are used to reduce personnel exposure to rock particulates, radon gas, and other hazards. A video detailing the operations at the mine is provided by Cameco.

The McArthur River mine has been awarded the Canadian Institute of Mining, Metallurgy and Petroleum's John T. Ryan Trophy for the best safety record for metal mines several times.  This award is given to the metal mine with the best safety record for the previous year.

Ownership
The mine is owned by Cameco (70%), and Orano Canada (30%) (formerly Areva Resources Canada, formerly COGEMA Resources Inc.) Cameco is the mine operator.

Access
The mine is serviced by the McArthur River Airport to the northeast. It is also connected to the south by a restricted access haulage road. According to Google Maps, this road is Saskatchewan Highway 914, however the official 2011 highway map of Saskatchewan indicates that 914 terminates at a checkpoint at Key Lake mine, while the road that continues to McArthur is not a public highway (owned by Cameco) and does not appear on maps.

Scale
Given that much of the uranium recovered here goes to fuel CANDU reactors which can forego uranium enrichment, it is possible to calculate a heating value for the uranium mined at this mine.

See also

Unconformity uranium deposits
Uranium mining
Uranium mining in Canada

References

External links
 
 

Uranium mines in Canada
Mines in Saskatchewan
Underground mines in Canada